Martha and I is a 1990 Czechoslovak-West German drama film directed by Jiří Weiss. It was entered into the main competition at the  47th Venice International Film Festival.

Cast 
Marianne Sägebrecht as Marta 
Michel Piccoli as Dr. Arnošt Fuchs 
Václav Chalupa as Emil 
Ondřej Vetchý as Old Emil 
Klaus Grünberg as Bertl 
Michael Kausch as Werner 
Božidara Turzonovová as Róza Kluge 
Vladimír Brabec as Father Kluge 
Jana Březinová as Ida 
Soňa Valentová as Elsa 
Jana Altmannová as Kamila 
Zuzana Kocúriková as Ilona 
Jiří Menzel as Dr. Benda

References

External links

1990s coming-of-age drama films
Czechoslovak drama films
1990 drama films
1990 films
Films directed by Jiří Weiss
West German films
Holocaust films
Czech coming-of-age drama films
German coming-of-age drama films
1990s Czech-language films
1990s German films